Jane Ann, Lady Winterton (née Hodgson; born 6 March 1941 in Sutton Coldfield) is a retired British Conservative Party politician who was the Member of Parliament (MP) for Congleton from 1983 to 2010. She is married to Sir Nicholas Winterton, also a former Conservative MP.

Parliamentary career 
Winterton was educated at Erdington Grammar School for Girls. Following her election to represent Congleton in 1983, she was a member of several select committees, including Agriculture (1987–1997), the chairman's panel (1992–1998) and the National Drug Strategy (1998–2001), Social Security (2000–2001) and the Unopposed Bills Panel since 1997. She is a representative of the Organisation for Security and Co-operation in Europe, and a patron of Cheshire National Society for the Prevention of Cruelty to Children. She is also president of the Congleton Pantomime Society.

Racism
Winterton became Shadow Minister for  Agriculture in 2001, and was later sacked from that position after she told the following joke at a dinner at Congleton rugby on 3 May 2002:

An Englishman, a Cuban, a Japanese man and a Pakistani were all on a train.
The Cuban threw a fine Havana cigar out the window. When he was asked why, he replied: "They are ten a penny in my country."
The Japanese man threw an expensive Nikon camera out of the carriage, adding: "These are ten a penny in my country."
The Englishman then picked up the Pakistani and threw him out of the train window.
When the other travellers asked him to account for his actions, he said: "They are ten a penny in my country."'

In February 2004 she had the Conservative whip removed for telling the following joke (which alluded to the recent death of twenty-three illegal immigrant Chinese cockle-pickers in Morecambe Bay) at a Whitehall private dinner party to improve Denmark–United Kingdom relations and declining to apologise:

One shark turned to the other to say he was fed up chasing tuna and the other said, "Why don't we go to Morecambe Bay and get some Chinese?"

A month later, Winterton apologised for the joke, and had the whip restored. Lord Taylor of Warwick, the only black Conservative peer in the House of Lords, criticised the decision to restore the whip and said she was not fit to be an MP.

Nick Palmer, then Labour MP for Broxtowe, who was at the dinner, criticised the joke and told BBC Radio 4's Today, "People were a bit stunned really. It was a very low-key friendly dinner. I was very sorry for the host – it was just a group of people discussing Danish issues."

Michael Howard, leader of the Conservatives, said, "Ann Winterton's remarks about the tragic deaths in Morecambe Bay were completely unacceptable. Such sentiments have no place in the Conservative Party. I deplore them and I apologise for them on behalf of my party."

In September 2005 (following the May general election), Winterton said she felt that Britain is a country where:

"Crime is out of control ... and where thousands of illegal immigrants are waved in with no checks on whether they are criminals or potential terrorists. [...] We live in times of tremendous change, but the United Kingdom is still, thankfully, a predominantly white, Christian country. [...] Some might say we are now paying the price for the so-called 'benefits' of the multicultural society, the product of almost uncontrolled immigration and the abuse of asylum."

Along with her husband, she managed to ask questions at Tony Blair's last Prime Minister's Questions in 2007.

MPs' misuse of expenses 

Together with Nicholas Winterton, Ann Winterton was investigated by the Parliamentary Commissioner for Standards, who concluded that they had misused their MPs' expenses to pay rent for a flat that they had already bought outright. The Wintertons transferred the ownership of the flat into a family trust to avoid the inheritance tax threshold. Since 2002, they had paid the rent for living in the flat from their MPs' expenditure. The Wintertons had declared their intentions to the Commons' Fees Office. On 25 May 2009, it was announced that both the Wintertons would stand down as MPs at the following general election. Winterton was one of 98 MPs who voted in favour of legislation which would have kept MPs' expense details secret.

Awards
Cheshire life Woman of the year

Bibliography

References

External links

Profiles
ePolitix – Ann Winterton official site
Guardian Unlimited Politics – Ask Aristotle: Ann Winterton MP
TheyWorkForYou.com – Ann Winterton MP
Ann Winterton: A 'family values' Tory – BBC profile

1941 births
Living people
Conservative Party (UK) MPs for English constituencies
Female members of the Parliament of the United Kingdom for English constituencies
UK MPs 1983–1987
UK MPs 1987–1992
UK MPs 1992–1997
UK MPs 1997–2001
UK MPs 2001–2005
UK MPs 2005–2010
People from Sutton Coldfield
20th-century British women politicians
21st-century British women politicians
National Society for the Prevention of Cruelty to Children people
Wives of knights
20th-century English women
20th-century English people
21st-century English women
21st-century English people
British Eurosceptics
Spouses of British politicians